The Dean of Killaloe is based at the Cathedral Church of St Flannan in Killaloe in the united diocese of Limerick, Killaloe and Ardfert within the Church of Ireland. The Dean of Killaloe is also Dean of St Brendans, Clonfert, Dean of Kilfenora, and both Dean and Provost of Kilmacduagh.

Since 2020 the incumbent is Roderick Lindsay Smyth.

Deans of Killaloe

1602–1624 Hugh O'Hogan 
1624–>1627 Richard Hacket 
1628 Alexander Spicer 
1637–1643 John Parker 
1643–1649 John Parker (son of above, deprived 1649 but later appointed Bishop of Elphin, 1660)
Interregnum
1661 Jasper Pheasant 
1692–1699 Jerome Ryves (afterwards Dean of St Patrick's Cathedral, 1699) 
1699–1727 James Abbadie (also known as Jakob Abbadie, writer) 
1727–1749 Giles Eyre
1750–1761 Hon Charles Talbot Blayney, 8th Baron Blayney 
1761–1768 William Henry
1768–1772 Hon Joseph Deane Bourke (afterwards Dean of Dromore, 1772 and later Bishop of Ferns and Leighlin) 
1772–1780 William Cecil Pery (afterwards Dean of Derry, 1780) 
1780–1781 Samuel Rastall 
1781–1787 Hon Thomas Stopford (afterwards Dean of Ferns, 1787) 
1787–1790 John Murray 
1790–1808 Peter Carleton 
1808–1828 John Bayly  (afterwards Dean of Lismore, 1828) 
1828–1830 Allen Morgan 
1830–1871 John Head 
1871–1880 James Hastings Allen 
1880–1886 Joseph Frederick Robbins 
1886–1917 Robert Humphries  
1917–? Henry John Gillespie 
1936–1943 Robert McNeil Boyd (afterwards Bishop of Killaloe and Kilfenora, 1943)
1957–1972 Edwin Owen (afterwards Bishop of Killaloe and Clonfert, 1972)
For Deans of Killaloe and Clonfert see below

Deans of Clonfert

1308 Gregory O'Brogan 
1319 James 
13??-1392 Michael (or Nicholas) O'Kelly died 
1407–1438 Thomas O'Longain 
1460–1470 Simon McKeogh 
1534 Roland de Burgo (made Bishop of Clonfert 1541 but remained Dean in commendam; died 1580) 
c1591 Donat O'Lorchan 
1597/8 Arilan Loughlin 
1622–1627 Revatius (or Ryvas) Tully 
1627/8 Robert Mawe 
1638 Samuel Pullein (fled to England, 1641, later Archbishop of Tuam, 1661) 
Interregnum
1661/2–1666 Richard Heaton 
1666 Nicholas Proude  
1669/70 Joshua Brooksbank 
1692–1726 John Burdett 
1726–1745 Robert Taylour 
1745–1766 William Crowe 
1766–1812 William Digby 
1812–1850 Thomas Hawkins 
1850–1864 Robert Mitchell Kennedy 
1864–1866 Charles Graves (afterwards Bishop of Limerick, Ardfert and Aghadoe 1866)
1866–?1897 James Byrne (died 1897)
?–?1906 Philip Graydon Tibbs (died 1906)
1926–1942 Le Bel Holbrooke Edward ffrench

Deans of Killaloe, Clonfert, Kilfenora and Kilmacduagh
1972-1986 Francis Robert Bourke
1987-1995 Ernon Cope Todd Perdue
1996-2001 Nicholas Marshall Cummins
2002–2012 Stephen Ross White
2013–2021 Gary Paulsen
2021–present Roderick Lindsay Smyth

References

 
 
Diocese of Limerick and Killaloe
Killaloe, Clonfert, Kilfenora and Kilmachduagh
Deans of Killaloe and Clonfert